Eduardo Quintero may refer to:

 Eduardo Quintero (diplomat)
 Eduardo Quintero (wrestler)